Pharaoh Brown (born May 4, 1994) is an American football tight end for the Cleveland Browns of the National Football League (NFL). He was signed by the Oakland Raiders as an undrafted free agent following the 2017 NFL Draft. He played college football at Oregon.

Early life
Brown grew up in Lyndhurst, Ohio where he played football and basketball at Brush High School, graduating in June 2012. During the college recruiting process, Brown initially committed to play for Michigan in May 2011, but ultimately signed his letter of intent to play at Oregon in February 2012.

College career
Brown played collegiate football at the University of Oregon. During his first year with the Ducks (2012), he was only targeted 3 times making 2 receptions for 42 yards. The following year, Brown appeared in 7 games making 3 starts and made 10 receptions for 123 yards, and 2 touchdowns. During his junior year, Brown would make his most touchdown receptions during his collegiate career at 6, while appearing in 9 games and starting 8. He made 25 receptions for 420 yards. Brown did not play football in 2015 due to a leg injury suffered during the 2014 season, during a game against Utah where he tore two ligaments in his knee. In Brown's senior year (2016), he would again appear in 9 games and start 8 of them, while being targeted 46 times and making 33 receptions. He scored 5 touchdowns while receiving for 426 yards.

Professional career

Oakland Raiders
Following the 2017 NFL Draft, Brown was signed by the Oakland Raiders as an undrafted free agent on May 5, 2017. He was waived on September 2, 2017 and was signed to the Raiders' practice squad the next day. He was promoted to the active roster on December 23, 2017.

On September 1, 2018, Brown was waived by the Raiders.

Cleveland Browns
On September 25, 2018, Brown was signed by the Cleveland Browns' practice squad. Brown was elevated to the Browns' active roster on October 23, 2018. He was placed on injured reserve on December 8, 2018 with a shoulder injury.

Brown re-signed with the Browns on April 20, 2020. He was placed on the active/physically unable to perform list at the start of training camp on July 29, 2020, and activated from the list ten days later. Brown was waived by the Browns on September 6, 2020.

Houston Texans
On September 14, 2020, Brown was signed to the Houston Texans practice squad, and promoted to the active roster the next day. In Week 10 of the 2020 season against the Cleveland Browns, he had his first professional touchdown.

Brown re-signed with the Texans on March 24, 2021. He played in 15 games with 12 starts, recording 23 catches for 171 yards.

On March 24, 2022, Brown re-signed with the Texans. He was waived on October 4, 2022.

Cleveland Browns (second stint)
On October 6, 2022, Brown was signed by the Cleveland Browns.

References

External links
Oregon Ducks bio
Houston Texans bio

1994 births
Living people
American football tight ends
Cleveland Browns players
Houston Texans players
Oakland Raiders players
Oregon Ducks football players
Players of American football from Cleveland